Shuckburgh may refer to:

Places
 Shuckburgh (crater), lunar crater in the northeastern part of the Moon's near side
 Lower Shuckburgh, small village in eastern Warwickshire
 Shuckburgh Hall, privately owned country house mansion at Lower Shuckburgh, near Daventry, Warwickshire

People
 Sir George Shuckburgh-Evelyn, 6th Baronet (1751–1804), English politician, mathematician and astronomer
 William Shuckburgh Swayne (1862–1941), Anglican priest and author
 Sir Evelyn Shuckburgh (1909–1994), British diplomat
 Evelyn Shirley Shuckburgh (1843–1906), English schoolmaster, classical scholar, and translator
 Alexander Shuckburgh (born 1982), also known as Al Shux, music producer and songwriter
 Shukburgh Ashby (1724–1792), British politician

Other
 Shuckburgh Baronets in the County of Warwick, a title in the Baronetage of England
 Shuckburgh telescope, an astronomical instrument built for the 6th baronet